Glyndyfrdwy railway station (Glin-duvver-doo-ee)  is a former station on the Ruabon to Barmouth line. The stop, which is near the village of Glyndyfrdwy in Denbighshire, Wales, is now a preserved railway station on the Llangollen Railway. It was reopened by the heritage railway in 1993.

History
The station was originally opened in May 1865 by the Llangollen to Corwen railway company. The route was constructed by Thomas Brassey under the direction of the prolific Scottish engineer, Henry Robertson. Glyndyfrdwy was the third stop for westbound trains after . 
According to the Official Handbook of Stations classes of traffic G, P & H were being handled at this station in 1956: and there was a 3-ton 10 cwt (3.6 tonne) crane.
It remained open for almost a hundred years, and it was due to be closed to passengers on Monday 18 January 1965. However, it was closed prematurely due to flood damage on 14 December 1964.

Preservation
It was reopened by the Llangollen Railway in 1993. The station has two side platforms alongside two tracks that provide a passing place on the single line. The restored non-operational signal box at the west end of the station is a listed structure from Barmouth South.

Services

References

Further reading

External links
 Glyndyfrdwy station on navigable 1946 O.S. map

Beeching closures in Wales
Heritage railway stations in Denbighshire
Railway stations in Great Britain opened in 1865
Railway stations in Great Britain closed in 1964
Llangollen Railway
Former Great Western Railway stations
Corwen